Greek National Road 39 (EO39) is a national highway of Greece. It connects Tripoli with Gytheio via Sparti. It is connected with the Greek National Road 7 (Corinth - Kalamata) in Tripoli, with the Moreas Motorway (Corinth - Kalamata) south of Tripoli, with the Greek National Road 82 (Pylos - Kalamata - Sparti) in Sparti, and with the Greek National Road 86 (Krokees - Monemvasia) in Krokees. Until 2016, the EO39 coincided with the European route E961 for most of its length, now it is mainly designated on the A71.

Since April 18, 2016, most of the traffic between Sparti and Tripoli is carried by the A71 (Megalopoli - Lefktro - Sparti).

References

39
Roads in Peloponnese (region)